This article gives an overview of the geomorphological division of Slovakia. It is ordered in a hierarchical form, belonging to the Alps-Himalaya System and to the sub-systems of the Carpathian Mountains and of the Pannonian Basin. These subsystems are subsequently divided into provinces, sub-provinces and areas.

Terminology (first Slovak, second English translation(s); see also:  (Slovak)):



Carpathian Mountains (Slovak: Karpaty) (sub-system)

Western Carpathians (Západné Karpaty) (province)

Inner Western Carpathians (Vnútorné Západné Karpaty) (sub-province)

Slovak Ore Mountains (Slovenské rudohorie) (area)
 Vepor Mountains (Veporské vrchy)
 Spiš-Gemer Karst (Spišsko-gemerský kras)
 Stolica Mountains (Stolické vrchy)
 Revúca Highlands (Revúcka vrchovina)
 Volovec Mountains (Volovské vrchy)
 Black Mountain, Slovakia (Čierna hora)
 Rožňava Basin (Rožňavská kotlina)
 Slovak Karst (Slovenský kras) and Aggtelek Karst (Hungarian: Aggteleki-karszt; lies in northern Hungary)

Fatransko-tatranská oblasť (Fatra-Tatra Area)
 Little Carpathians (Malé Karpaty)
 Považský Inovec 
 Tribeč
 Strážov Mountains (Strážovské vrchy)
 Žiar
 Malá Fatra (Lesser Fatra)
 Veľká Fatra (Greater Fatra)
 Starohorské vrchy
 Chočské vrchy
 Tatra Mountains (Tatry)
 Low Tatras (Nízke Tatry)
 Kozie chrbty
 Branisko
 Žilinská kotlina (Žilina Basin) 
 Hornonitrianska kotlina (Upper Nitra Basin)
 Turčianska kotlina (Turiec Basin)
 Podtatranská kotlina
 Hornádska kotlina (Hornád Basin)
 Horehronské podolie

Slovenské stredohorie (Slovak Medium Mountains) (area)
 Vtáčnik
 Pohronský Inovec
 Štiavnické vrchy (Štiavnica Mountains)
 Kremnické vrchy (Kremnica Mountains)
 Poľana
 Ostrôžky
 Javorie
 Krupinská planina (Krupina Plain)
 Zvolenská kotlina (Zvolen Basin)
 Pliešovská kotlina
 Žiarska kotlina (Žiar Basin)

Lučensko-košická zníženina (Lučenec-Košice Depression) (area)
 Bodvianska pahorkatina 
 Juhoslovenská kotlina (Southern Slovak Basin)
 Košická kotlina (Košice Basin)

Matransko-slanská oblasť (Matra-Slanec Area) 
 Burda
 Cerová vrchovina
 Slanské vrchy
 Zemplínske vrchy

Outer Western Carpathians (Vonkajšie Západné Karpaty) (sub-province)

Slovak-Moravian Carpathians (Slovensko-moravské Karpaty) (area)
 White Carpathians (Biele Karpaty)
 Javorníky
 Myjavská pahorkatina (Myjava Hills)
 Považské podolie

Západné Beskydy (Western Beskids) (area)
 Moravsko-sliezske Beskydy (Moravian-Silesian Beskids)
 Turzovská vrchovina
 Jablunkovské medzihorie

Stredné Beskydy (Central Beskids) (area)
 Kysucké Beskydy
 Oravské Beskydy
 Kysucká vrchovina
 Podbeskydská brázda
 Podbeskydská vrchovina
 Oravská Magura
 Oravská vrchovina (Orava Highlands)

Východné Beskydy ("Eastern Beskids") (area)
 Pieniny
 Ľubovnianska vrchovina
 Čergov

Podhôľno-magurská oblasť (Podhale-Magura Area)
 Skorušinské vrchy
 Podtatranská brázda
 Spišská Magura 
 Levočské vrchy (Levoča Hills)
 Bachureň
 Spišsko-šarišské medzihorie
 Šarišská vrchovina (Šariš Highlands)
 Oravská kotlina (Orava Basin)

Eastern Carpathians (Východné Karpaty) (province)

Inner Eastern Carpathians (Vnútorné Východné Karpaty) (sub-province)

Vihorlatsko-gutínska oblasť (Vihorlat-Gutín Area) 
 Vihorlat Mountains (Vihorlatské vrchy)

Outer Eastern Carpathians (Vonkajšie Východné Karpaty) (sub-province)

Poloniny Mountains (area)
 Bukovské vrchy (Bukovec Mountains)

Nízke Beskydy (Low Beskids) (area)
Busov
Ondavská vrchovina (Ondava Highlands)
Laborecká vrchovina (Laborec Highlands)
Beskydské predhorie (Beskidian Piedmont)

Pannonian Basin (Panónska panva) (sub-system)

Západopanónska panva (West Pannonian Basin)(province)

Vienna Basin (Viedenská kotlina) (sub-province)

Záhorská nížina (Záhorie Lowland) (area)
Borská nížina
Chvojnická pahorkatina

Juhomoravská panva (South Moravian Basin) (area)
Dolnomoravský úval

Malá dunajská kotlina (Little Hungarian Plain) (sub-province)

Podunajská nížina (Danubian Lowland) (area)
Podunajská pahorkatina (Danubian Hills)
Podunajská rovina (Danubian Flat)

Východopanónska panva (Eastern Pannonian Basin) (province)

Veľká dunajská kotlina (Great Hungarian Plain) (sub-province)

Východoslovenská nížina (Eastern Slovak Lowland) (area)
Východoslovenská pahorkatina (Eastern Slovak Hills)
Východoslovenská rovina (Eastern Slovak Flat)

Literature 

Mazúr E., Lukniš M., Balatka B., Loučková J., Sládek J. (1986). Geomorfologické členenie SSR a ČSSR. Mapa mierky 1:500 000, Slovenská kartografia, SUGK, Bratislava.

Geography of Slovakia